Intentional Talk is an hour long (during the regular season) and a 30-minute-long (during the offseason) talk show shown live Monday-Friday at 4:00 ET (during the regular season) or at 3:30 ET (during the offseason) on MLB Network. Hosts Siera Santos, Kevin Millar, and Ryan Dempster talk about the major events in baseball. Viewers are also allowed to tweet to the hosts during the show to voice their opinions and some of the tweets are shown on a marquee at the bottom of the screen, seen in "Ask Kevin" and/or read by Stephen. Nelson was named the new co-host of IT in 2021 after former co-host Chris Rose left the show at the end of 2020 because MLB Network was unable to renew his contract. Nelson left the show at the end of January 2023 to join the Dodgers broadcast team. In March 2023 Siera Santos and Ryan Dempster where named Millar's new co-hosts.

The show is filmed from Studio 42 of the MLB Network facility in Secaucus, New Jersey. Most times, when they are not in the studio, they will film the show from the hosts' homes. When this happens, the show is shown as a split-screen, using Cisco TelePresence, in which Kevin hosts from his house in Austin, Texas (also known as "Studio 1-5").

During the 2011 season, MLB Network started showing a special one-hour, recorded Best of Intentional Talk each weekend, showcasing the best segments of the show from the past week to be topped off with the weekly, "This Week in MLB Network" segment.

On the Friday, January 25, 2013 show, the hosts allowed viewers to call the shots. Everything on the show that day was fan-based, including "Ask Kevin", "Five for Friday", the Got HEEEEM and HELLOOOOO introduction. On Twitter, they asked for YouTube videos for segments, such as "What just Happened?" and "That was Awkward". The IT Fan Show returned for the July 24, 2013 show.

On March 13, 2013, the show announced it was getting a new introduction for the 2013 season, as seen here. This was the show's first introduction change, as the older version was with the show since the start. The new introduction seems to take place in a pinball machine with slots, bumpers and a pinball going around signs, such as "Got HEEEEM" and "Outta Here", ending off with the ball hitting the word "grand slam". The intro debuted on Opening Day 2013 (April 1, 2013).  The intro and theme song changed starting with the April 4, 2016 episode to a circus-themed intro with Rose and Millar as ringmasters and the theme song changed to "Ladies and Gentlemen" by Saliva.  For the ESPN2 airings, some MLB Network logos are replaced by the ESPN logo.

Each episode is uploaded to podcast applications the morning after each airing.

The show was added to the ESPN2 weekday afternoon lineup from 4-5 PM eastern starting May 1, 2017, and the show continues to air on MLB Network in its current timeslot.

Personalities

Hosts
Chris Rose (2011-2020)
Kevin Millar (2011-present)
Stephen Nelson (2021-2023)
Siera Santos (2023-present)
Ryan Dempster (2023-present)

Guest Hosts
Greg Amsinger
Eric Byrnes
Sean Casey
Mark DeRosa
Cliff Floyd
Al Leiter
Dan Plesac
Harold Reynolds
Bill Ripken
Paul Severino
John Smoltz
Matt Vasgersian
Tom Verducci
Matt Yallof
Brian Kenny
Heidi Watney
Robert Flores
Pedro Martínez
Tim Flannery
Ron Darling
Preston Wilson
Fran Charles
Adnan Virk

Reporters
Hazel Mae (2011)
Alanna Rizzo (2012-2013)
Kristina Fitzpatrick (2014)
Heidi Watney (2015-2021)
Scott Braun (2017-2022)

Segments

Seen Daily
Baseball Announcers Filling Time - A segment in which a video is shown listening to baseball announcers talking about random and unrelated things.
Best Interview in Baseball - A segment in which Stephen and Kevin talk to a different player each day using the Cisco Ballpark Cam (or Skype during the offseason).
Got HEEEEM! - A segment where Kevin shows a clip of a player or fan caught in an embarrassing or awkward situation on camera. This is usually the last bit of the show.  If the victim is female, the segment ends with Millar saying "Got SHEEEEM!".
Irrelevant Video of the Day - A segment in which a random video is shown. This video has no relation to what was being talked about and usually has no relation to baseball at all.
Kevin's Highlights - A segment in which Kevin Millar goes through what happened the night before or earlier on that day, that usually is funny and/or odd.
Show Biz - A segment where Stephen and Kevin discuss the biggest topic of the day. This leads off the show.  On April 4, 2016, this segment's title was changed to "Opening Act" in accordance with the change to a circus theme.
Sound Check - A segment in which a collection of sound bites are put together to recap some highlights over the past day.
That Was Awkward! - A segment where a clip of an uncomfortable moment is shown.
What Just Happened? - A segment when they show a clip with a huge oddity and ask "What just happened?"

Seen Often
Ask Kevin - A segment in which viewers ask Kevin questions through Twitter and he answers them. Starting in July 2013, Millar would give away an item to the person who asked the best question.
Baseball Updates - When there are games going on, Stephen and Kevin usually show updates of the games in progress during the show.
Cool Story Bro - A segment where an MLB Network personality is seen rambling on about an unrelated topic.
Goin' Back in Time - A segment when the show goes back in time to show a clip or a person.
Heidi's Headlines - Heidi Watney delivers some baseball news and tests the hosts' baseball knowledge with a trivia question.
Stick to Baseball - A segment when a baseball-related person does something unrelated to baseball and is told to stick to baseball.
Turning Two - A segment in which Kevin and Stephen ask each other several questions.

Seen Weekly
Five For Friday - A weekly segment where Stephen and Kevin ask each other five questions for the weekend series, exclusively seen on Fridays.
This Week in MLB Network - A 1:15 minute blooper reel of MLB Network personalities and hosts, shown during the last episode of the week, usually Fridays.

Seen Sometimes
I'm Buyin' or Keep Tryin' - A segment where Stephen and Kevin decide if they are buying or not buying a statement by a baseball player.
Boys Club - A segment where an MLB Network analyst comes out to discuss the news with Stephen and Kevin.
Deep Thoughts with Kevin Millar - A segment where Kevin goes and gives his deep thoughts on topics or certain people, giving people credit.
International Talk - A short segment featuring a baseball play with someone calling the game in a different language.
Moments From Our Grand Game - A segment where they show a clip about the game or a mistake from a broadcast that was corrected about baseball.
Stick to Broadcasting - A segment when a baseball-related broadcaster does something unrelated to broadcasting and is told to stick to broadcasting.
Wheel of Stuff - A segment where an analyst spins a wheel and asks a question relating to what the wheel lands on.
Colon-Oscopy - A segment usually shown after every start Atlanta Braves pitcher Bartolo Colón makes. It features highlights from Colón in the game, and they usually find humorous stuff to make fun of.

Sponsorships
For The Love of Beer - A segment that had Chris and Kevin at the Samuel Adams factory, discovering beer, looking at beer and having beer contests. It was only seen in episodes sponsored with Samuel Adams (in mid-2012).
Home Field Advantage - A segment where Chris and Kevin discuss baseball stadiums or Studio 42 in MLB Network. It was only seen in episodes sponsored by Scott's (in April 2013).
Million Dollar Question - A segment that has a question about baseball that is worth "a million dollars" that Chris asks Kevin (in April 2011) or the quiz Alanna Rizzo gives Chris and Kevin (in April 2012). It was only seen in episodes sponsored with MLB 2K 12.
USAA Salutes - A segment where an army member asks Kevin a question and he responds, usually before the Rizzo Report. It was sponsored by USAA.
Valvoline NextGen Performance - A segment where Chris and Kevin showcase a rookie or a younger player that had a great performance or did well in a baseball game. It was only seen in episodes sponsored by Valvoline NextGen (in May 2013).

Seen Rarely
Big Leaguing a Big Leaguer - A segment showing a number of clips of Chris Rose making big league comments to a big leaguer, during interviews.
Circling the Pillows - A segment when Chris and Kevin show the viewer mammoth home run shots from the previous night.
Intriguing or Intriguing-er - A segment where Chris asks Kevin about two topics and which one is more intriguing.
Mayor's Office - A segment with Sean Casey, who was subbing for Alanna Rizzo, giving out headlines and doing a trivia question. It was interrupted for a few minutes, due to gibberish language and a Matt Vasgersian cameo. The segment reappears when Sean Casey hosts if they have time for it.
What's the Bigger Number? - A segment in which Chris asks Kevin which one of two things will have the bigger number (ex: more homers or more runs).
Wordplay - A segment where Chris and Kevin finished a sentence with a word. Kevin kept using large words that he didn't know. Mitch filled in for Kevin once.

Seen Specifically
Got TEEEEM - A segment seen in February, that was previously known as Got Team, this segment features Stephen asking Kevin three questions about each of the thirty baseball teams before the upcoming season. In the 2011-2012 offseason, following the questions were team-related Kevin's Highlights.
Great Moments in Fatherhood - A segment where Kevin's fatherhood abilities are shown off.
March to March - Seen during the postseason, this is a segment about a team that had just been eliminated from the postseason.
Math with Millar - Seen during early to mid September, this is a segment in which Kevin does math to figure out several team's faith heading into the postseason.
Three For the Road - Seen during the postseason, this is a segment during the postseason, where three questions are asked about each series, starting with the LCS and ending with the World Series. The questions are: What will you be surprised to see? What are you worried about? What will be trending on Twitter?
Top 50 Players Right Now - Judging by stats and their interviews with the show, Stephen and Kevin rated the top 50 players to appear on Intentional Talk.

One-Timers
Banana in the Tailpipe - A segment showing a number of clips of someone doing the banana in the tailpipe challenge.
Cy or Sigh? - A segment where Chris asked Kevin how much impact each of the seven Cy Young award starters that were starting on that night will make for the 2013 season.
Inspirational Talk - A segment where the Cleveland Indians radio broadcasters talked about Terry Francona's hilarious interview with the show earlier on in the day on April 22, 2013 and complemented the show and wanted fans to watch the episode on reruns.
IT Call To Arms - A segment where Chris and Kevin picked three starting pitchers each one night and whoever did the best would win in the next show.
Intriguing or Intriguing-er - A segment where Chris brings up two topics and asks which one is more intriguing (or intriguing-er) to Kevin.
Riskier or Reward-er - A segment where Chris and Kevin decide if four of thirteen players who got qualified offers in 2013 will be riskier or reward-er in the offers.
Stamp On It - A segment where Chris and Dan Plesac graded offseason deals from one to three stamps (one being bad and three being great).
Taste Test - A segment where they see the stats of two anonymous players and pick which guy they'd rather have. After Chris and Kevin  both pick which player they'd rather have, they reveal who the players are.
What Are The Chances? - A segment where Chris and Kevin wonder if some individual records will be broken over or under a certain percentage.
What's Adam Up To? - A segment featuring Adam (Kevin Millar's behind the scene technologist during shows) looking around and sitting in Kevin's seat.
What's in Kevin's Stocking? - A segment with Kevin Millar's four children driving around in go-karts (that said "GOT HEEEEM" and "ONE-FIVE") they got for Christmas.
What's the Deal 1-5? - A segment with Kevin and Chris rated the deals, moves and transactions from a scale of one through five in the 2013 Trade Deadline.
 You Sure This is a Good Idea? - A segment featuring Chris asking Kevin if it is a good idea to eat twinkies instead of a salad. This segment birthed Chris' nickname as "Puddin Face"

Former
Call IT Like You See IT - A segment where Chris and Kevin post a picture on Facebook and ask for the best captions. They would be revealed on the bottom of the screen or read out loud.
Don't Be That Guyer - A segment in which Kevin looks at players who are not doing what they should be or doing something they shouldn't do. At the end of this segment, Kevin looks at players working hard and this is called "Be that Guyer".
Hazel's Headlines - A segment with former reporter Hazel Mae, who brings up smaller baseball headlines and a quiz for Chris and Kevin. It was usually seen daily in the middle of the show. It was retired after she left the network in 2011.
Rizzo Report - A segment with reporter Alanna Rizzo, who brings up smaller baseball headlines and a quiz for Chris and Kevin. Anthony Rizzo's interviews are also headlined as the Rizzo Report. It started in 2012 and was retired after she left the network in 2013.
Meet and Tweet - A segment where people tweet a picture with an Intentional Talk sign and they will get their pictures seen toward the middle or end of the show.
Remembering One-Five - A segment, where former baseball players or people Millar knows sends him an eGraph.
Sneaky Hot - A segment in which Chris and Kevin looks at players who go unnoticed but are really doing well.
Three Up, Three Down - A segment in which Chris and Kevin take turns talking about the good and bad things going on in baseball every Monday until 2013.
Would You Rather - A segment where Chris asks Kevin if you would rather see one of two options.

Audio podcast
MLB Network launched the "Intentional Talk: Caught Listening" audio podcast, hosted by Rose and Millar, in late-March 2018.

MLB Now Crossover
On June 19, 2013 Intentional Talk crossed over with the MLB Network Original Series MLB Now. It counted as an MLB Now episode and not an Intentional Talk episode. Kevin Millar guest starred on the episode while Chris Rose did not appear. The crossover was titled MLB Intentional Now.

The Rundown Crossover
In January 2014 Intentional Talk crossed over with The Rundown. It counted as an Intentional Talk episode and not an Rundown episode. Matt Yallof appeared while Lauren Shehadi did not. The crossover was titled Intentional Rundown Talk.

Hot Stove Crossover
In February 2014 Hot Stove crossed over with Intentional Talk. It counted as an Intentional Talk episode and not a Hot Stove episode. Harold Reynolds appeared while Matt Vasgersian did not. The crossover was titled Hot Talk.

High Heat Crossover
On April 14, 2014 Intentional Talk crossed over with High Heat. It counted as a High Heat episode and not an Intentional Talk episode. Kevin Millar appeared while Chris Rose did not. The crossover was titled Intentional Heat Talk.

MLB Central Crossovers
Since MLB Central premiered in Spring 2015, Intentional Talk has had a crossover segment on MLB Central called Breakfast with the Millars. The segment features Kevin Millar while Chris Rose does not appear.

Second Hot Stove crossover 
On February 17, 2016 Intentional Talk crossed over with Hot Stove. Chris Rose, Kevin Millar, Matt Vasgersian, and Harold Reynold's all appeared in the special crossover event. This is the first crossover in which all the main cast members from both Intentional Talk and the other show appeared in.

References

2010s American television talk shows
2011 American television series debuts
MLB Network original programming
American sports television series